The Frederick J. Osterling Office and Studio at 228 Isabella Street in the North Shore neighborhood of Pittsburgh, Pennsylvania, was built in 1917.  This Gothic Revival building was designed by architect Frederick J. Osterling, and was used as his office and studio in 1918.

It was added to the National Register of Historic Places on September 5, 1985, and the List of Pittsburgh History and Landmarks Foundation Historic Landmarks in 2004.

Images

References

Commercial buildings on the National Register of Historic Places in Pennsylvania
Commercial buildings completed in 1917
Gothic Revival architecture in Pennsylvania
Office buildings in Pittsburgh
Frederick J. Osterling buildings
Pittsburgh History & Landmarks Foundation Historic Landmarks
National Register of Historic Places in Pittsburgh